Phegopteris is a genus of ferns in the family Thelypteridaceae, subfamily Phegopteridoideae, in the Pteridophyte Phylogeny Group classification of 2016 (PPG I). They are known collectively as the beech ferns. Species are native to Asia, North America and Europe.

Taxonomy
Phegopteris was first described in 1852 by Carl Borivoj Presl as an unranked taxon within the genus Polypodium. It was raised to the rank of genus by Antoine Fée in the same year.

The Pteridophyte Phylogeny Group classification of 2016 (PPG I) recognizes three genera in the subfamily Phegopteridoideae: Macrothelypteris, Phegopteris and Pseudophegopteris. , both the Checklist of Ferns and Lycophytes of the World and Plants of the World Online regarded Pseudophegopteris as a synonym of Phegopteris.

Species
, the Checklist of Ferns and Lycophytes of the World accepted the following species:

Phegopteris andringitrensis (Rakotondr.) Christenh.
Phegopteris aubertii (Desv.) Christenh.
Phegopteris aurita (Hook.) J.Sm.
Phegopteris connectilis (Michx.) Watt
Phegopteris cruciata (Willd.) Mett. ex Kuhn
Phegopteris cyclocarpa (Holttum) Christenh.
Phegopteris decursivepinnata (H.C.Hall) Fée
Phegopteris dianae (Hook.) Christenh.
Phegopteris henriquesii (Baker) Christenh.
Phegopteris heterolepis Alderw.
Phegopteris hexagonoptera (Michx.) Fée
Phegopteris keraudreniana (Gaudich.) Mann
Phegopteris kinabaluensis (Holttum) Christenh.
Phegopteris koreana B.Y.Sun & C.H.Kim
Phegopteris levingei (C.B.Clarke) Tagawa
Phegopteris microstegia (Hook.) Christenh.
Phegopteris paludosa (Blume) J.Sm.
Phegopteris persimilis (Baker) Christenh.
Phegopteris rectangularis (Zoll.) Christenh.
Phegopteris subaurita (Tagawa) Tagawa
Phegopteris tenggerensis (Holttum) comb. ined.

Plants of the World Online listed further species which  the Checklist of Ferns and Lycophytes of the World regards as synonyms:
Phegopteris hirtirachis (C.Chr.) Christenh. = Phegopteris microstegia ssp. hirtirachis
Phegopteris fijiensis (K.U.Kramer & E.Zogg) Christenh. = Phegopteris paludosa
Phegopteris tibetana (Ching & S.K.Wu) Christenh. = Phegopteris aurita
Phegopteris tibetica Ching = Phegopteris connectilis
Phegopteris yigongensis (Ching) Christenh. = Phegopteris levingei 
Phegopteris zayuensis (Ching & S.K.Wu) Christenh. = Phegopteris aurita

References

External links
 http://www.borealforest.org/ferns/fern16.htm

Thelypteridaceae
Fern genera